Simonovo is a rural locality (a selo) and the administrative center of Simonovsky Selsoviet, Uglovsky District, Altai Krai, Russia. The population was 634 as of 2013. It was founded in 1901. There are 6 streets.

Geography 
Simonovo is located 49 km north of Uglovskoye (the district's administrative centre) by road. Chernokorovnikovo is the nearest rural locality.

References 

Rural localities in Uglovsky District, Altai Krai